Agusan may refer to the following:

In geography

 Agusan province, a former province in the Philippines, now divided between:
 Agusan del Norte
 Agusan del Sur
 Legislative district of Agusan in the Philippines for the former province before it was divided into two separate ones
Agusan River, a river in Mindanao
The Agusan Marsh Wildlife Sanctuary

Other

 A symbol in the Tironian notes shorthand system when used as an abbreviation for "and" in Scottish Gaelic
 Agusan language, a Manobo language of The Philippines